The Kolva is a river in Perm Krai, Russia, right tributary of the Vishera of the Kama basin. It starts on southeastern slope of mount Kolvinsky Kamen, in northeastern portion of Perm Krai, near the border with Komi Republic. Its mouth is near the town of Cherdyn.

The Kolva freezes up in early November and stays under the ice until late April or early May. The river is navigable within  of its estuary during the high-water season. The town of Cherdyn is along on the Kolva.

Main tributaries (from source to mouth):
 Left: Yamzhach, Seleya, Kumay, Ayya, Tulpan, Beryozovaya, Ukhtym, Nizva, Mudyl, Chudova.
 Right: Nyariz, Sukhotyl, Nyuzim, Anyl, Visherka, Vizhaikha, Bubyl, Lyzovka.

History
The ancient route from the Volga region in the Pechora region passed along the Kolva. Between Cherdyn and Nyrob were found several Chud settlements, in which occur oriental coins, evidence of the importance of the Kolva as a route of communication between ancient Volga Bulgaria and the remote north.

References

Rivers of Perm Krai